PowerPac Economic Zone is a private export processing zone located in Mongla Port, Khulna. It is the first Special Economic Zone under PPP model. The site for the PowerPac economic zone has been identified as a land parcel of 205 acres that lies 40 km from Khulna city, 105 km from Jessore airport and 230 km from capital Dhaka.

History

August 2015 the negotiation teams of Bangladesh Economic Zones Authority (BEZA) and PowerPac have finalized the draft agreement for appointment of Developer of Mongla Economic Zone (PPP model). An agreement will be signed between Bangladesh Economic Zones Authority (BEZA) and PowerPac after the draft is approved by Prime Minister's Office and vetted by Legislative and Parliamentary Airfares Division. PowerPac is a subsidiary of Sikder Group.

Connectivity
Road: 40 km from Khulna City, 230 km from Dhaka
Rail: 38 km from Dhaka - Khulna rail link, a busiest rail track for passenger and freight transport
Air: 105 km from Jessore Airport
River: Direct access to Mongla River (Mongla Port, country's 2nd largest sea port is located 0.5 km away)

References

Special economic zones of Bangladesh
Khulna